Carrollton (formerly, Mosteller) was an American contemporary Christian music band from Cincinnati, Ohio and Louisville, Kentucky, United States. They formed in 2008, as Mosteller. Their current members are bass guitarist/background vocalist Jordan Bailey, drummer/background vocalist Michael Loy, lead vocalist/guitarist Stephen Moore, and lead guitarist/background vocalist David Terry. They released Breathe in Deep, an extended play (EP), with Centricity Music in 2014, and this EP was reviewed by many Christian music publications. The song, "Holding on to You", charted on the Christian Airplay Billboard magazine chart. Their 2017 song "Made For This" was featured in advertisements for NBCUniversal's coverage of the 2018 Winter Olympics. Carrollton released its latest project, a self-titled album, on May 8, 2020. On March 25, 2021, Carrollton made an announcement on Instagram that they will no longer be making music.

Background
The contemporary Christian music band Christian rock music group formed in both Cincinnati, Ohio and Louisville, Kentucky, in 2008, as Mosteller, yet they renamed themselves Carrollton in 2013. They count as their members; lead vocalist and guitarist, Stephen Moore, background vocalist and bass guitarist, Jordan Bailey, background vocalist and drummer, Michael Loy, and background vocalist and lead guitarist, David Terry. At the conclusion of the Shelter Tour in 2018, it was announced that Justin Mosteller and Joel Rousseau would be leaving the band.

Music history
The group was formed in 2008, yet their first major label release extended play, did not get released until February 11, 2014, Breathe in Deep, by Centricity Music. The song, "Holding on to You", peaked at No. 42 on the Billboard magazine Christian Airplay chart.

Members
Current members
 Jordan Bailey – bass, background vocals (2008–present)
 Michael Loy – drums, background vocals (2008–present)
 David Terry – lead guitar, background vocals (2018–present)
 Stephen Moore – lead vocals, guitar (2018–present)

Former members
Jeremy Menard - lead guitar, background vocals (2008-2015) (various shows 2018)
Justin Mosteller - lead vocals, guitar (2008-2018)
Joel Rousseau - lead guitar, background vocals (2015-2018)

Discography

Studio albums

EPs

Singles

As featured artist

References

External links
 Official website

Musical groups established in 2008
Musical groups from Cincinnati
Musical groups from Louisville, Kentucky
Centricity Music artists
Christian rock groups from Ohio
Christian rock groups from Kentucky
2008 establishments in Ohio
2008 establishments in Kentucky